Sardar Singh (29 August 1798 – 14 July 1842) was the Maharana of Mewar Kingdom (r. 1838–1842). He was great grandson of Sangram Singh II, grandson of Nath Singh of Bagore, son of Shivdan Singh of Bagore who were the Thikanedars of Bagore. He and was adopted by Maharana Jawan Singh to succeed him. He was succeeded by his brother Swarup Singh.

References 

Mewar dynasty
1798 births
1842 deaths